Alison Van Uytvanck was the defending champion, but chose to participate at the 2014 Open GDF Suez de Limoges instead.

Vitalia Diatchenko won the title, defeating Chan Yung-jan in the final, 1–6, 6–2, 6–4.

Seeds

Draw

Finals

Top half

Bottom half

References 
 Main draw
 Qualifying draw

OEC Taipei WTA Challenger - Singles
Taipei WTA Ladies Open
2014 in Taiwanese tennis